Scott Gates may refer to:

 Scott Gates (academic) (born 1957), American political scientist
 Scott Gates (footballer) (born 1988), German-born football player